The Măreasca is a left tributary of the river Sighișoara in Romania. It flows into the Sighișoara in Brazii.

References

Rivers of Romania
Rivers of Arad County